Shady Grove may refer to the following places in the U.S. state of Florida:
Shady Grove, Jackson County, Florida
Shady Grove, Taylor County, Florida